Beaconella is an ichnogenus comprising a wide trace thought to be constructed by a burrowing arthropod ploughing through the sediment for food, leaving a mound of piled sediment at the end of each trace.

See also
 Beaconites

References

Burrow fossils